The London School of Jewish Studies (commonly known as LSJS, originally founded as Jews' College)  is a London-based organisation providing adult educational courses and training to the wider Jewish community. Since 2012 LSJS also offers rabbinical training, returning to its roots.

Many leading figures in British Jewry have been associated with the School, including Michael Friedländer, Principal from 1865 to 1907;  Isidore Epstein, Principal 1948–1961; Louis Jacobs, Moral Tutor 1959–1961; and in recent years Jonathan Sacks (later Lord Sacks), Principal 1984–1990.

Translation works, including for Tanach and the Talmud, were made by "Scholars involved with Jews' College."

History
The London School of Jewish Studies was founded as Jews' College in 1855, a rabbinical seminary in London. The organisation was re-focused and given its present name in 1999, with an emphasis on providing a broader range of adult educational courses and training to the wider Jewish community.  The rabbinical training programme was suspended, and much of the historical holdings of the library were sold off.  LSJS has had growing success in its new role, and since 2012 once again offers rabbinical training, in partnership with the programme set up by the London Sephardi community.

Jews' College
Jews' College was opened in Finsbury Square, London, as a rabbinical seminary in 1855 with the support of Chief Rabbi Nathan Adler and of Sir Moses Montefiore, who had conceived the idea for such a venture as early as 1841. The college quickly established itself as a place where high quality rabbinical training was available and its alumni and staff often became prominent in Anglo-Jewry.

In 1881, the College moved to larger premises in Tavistock Square, close to University College, where it was envisaged that Jews' College students would be able to combine their religious studies and university studies to degree level. As early as  1904, the University of London granted an Honours degree in Hebrew and Aramaic, all of the candidates being from Jews' College. In 1932, with the building of Woburn House, a centre for Anglo-Jewry, still in Tavistock Square, Jews' College moved again.

During the Second World War, despite the bombing of London, the College kept its doors open. Apart from the rabbinical studies and degree course, Chazzanut courses and teacher training programmes were now offered.

In 1954, the College moved, yet again, to larger premises in Montagu Place. That building in central London was sold in the early 1980s and now houses the Embassy of Sweden.  The College operated from temporary premises at Finchley Synagogue for a number of years, under the leadership of Rabbi Dr Nahum Rabinovitch. Under the auspices of Rabbi Dr Jonathan Sacks and with the financial backing of Stanley Kalms, chairman of Dixons, the College relocated in 1984 to its current building, now known as Schaller House, in Hendon, North-West London, close to the hub of London's Jewish community.

London School of Jewish Studies
In 1998, the University of London announced that it would be terminating the "Associated Institute" status that the College and three other small institutions enjoyed. Jews' College was forced to seek an academic partner within the University in order to be able to continue its degree programmes. Without the freedom to determine its own curriculum and the financial security that came from student fee income, it became increasingly difficult for the College to survive in its previous form. Rabbinic training was also uneconomic as many students looked to the Torah centres of Israel and America for their education and the number of available rabbinic posts in the UK decreased.

In 2002, the School of Oriental and African Studies (SOAS) decided to terminate its relationship with LSJS, which threatened the organisation's status. A small team of young community leaders and educators, led by the late Marc Weinberg, presented the then Chair of Council, Howard Stanton, with a proposal to use the human and financial resources available to refocus the School's activities and to secure its future as a hub of academic study and lifelong learning, catering to a wide spectrum of the community.

Since then, under the leadership of Dr. Raphael Zarum and Dr. Tamra Wright, LSJS has welcomed hundreds of students to a range of academic courses and events. In addition to numerous community-focused offerings, more formal programs include:
The LSJS, as of 2012, offers a Semicha programme, in conjunction with the Judith Lady Montefiore College. The part-time programme is of four years' duration (38 study weeks per year; 16 lecture hours per week). The curriculum focuses on Halacha as standard; but the course also includes Tanakh, history and ethics, as well as practical community-directed subjects such as counselling, public speaking, life events, hazanut and teaching skills. 
LSJS also hosts The Montefiore Kollel, comprising an "intensive" one-year programme focused on in-depth Gemara study with emphasis on halachic applications. Applicants to the Semicha programme may be required to first spend one year in the Kollel.
The LSJS offers the following degree programs: the M.A. degree in Jewish Studies with King's College, London; and the BA (Hons) and MA in Jewish education  with Middlesex University.

Alei Tzion
The London School of Jewish Studies houses the synagogue Alei Tzion. Services take place regularly. These include; Shacharit, Mincha and Maariv prayer. The complete Shabbat services include two children's services.

Notable alumni
Michael Adler (1868–1944), first Jewish military chaplain to serve in a Theatre of War (1915–1918)
Francis Lyon Cohen (1862–1934), first Jewish military chaplain to the British Army (1892–1904)
Barnett A. Elzas (1867–1936), rabbi and historian in America
Benzion Halper (1884–1924), Hebraist, Arabist, professor at Dropsie College
 Chief Rabbi Cyril Harris (1936–2005), South Africa Chief Rabbi (1987–2004)
 Rabbi Dr Raymond Apple AO (born 1935), Senior Rabbi of the Great Synagogue (Sydney) (1972–2005)
 Lord Jakobovits

Principals 

 Louis Loewe (1809–1888) served as the first principal (1855–1858)
 Barnett Abrahams (1831–1863) served as principal (1858–1865)
 Michael Friedlaender (1833–1910) served as principal (1865–1907)
 Adolf Buechler (1846–1939) served as principal (1907–1939)
 Isidore Epstein (1894–1962) served as principal (1945–1961)
 Hirsch Jacob Zimmels (1900–1975) served as principal (1964–1969)
 Nachum Rabinovitch (1928–2020) served as principal (1971–1983)
 Jonathan Sacks (1948–2020) served as principal (1984–1990)
 Irving Jacobs (1937–2020) served as principal (1990–1993)
 Daniel Sinclair

References

Further reading
 Isidore Harris (1906), History of Jews' College : November 11th 1855 – November 10th 1905 London: Luzac & Co.
 Albert Montefiore Hyamson (1955), Jews’ College, London, 1855–1955
 Ruth Goldschmidt-Lehmann (1960; revised 1967), History of Jews’ College Library, 1860–1960
 Derek Taylor (2017), Defenders of the Faith: The History of Jews’ College and the London School of Jewish Studies. London: Vallentine Mitchell

External links 
 Website of the London School of Jewish Studies
 Lists of Jews' College students

Education in the London Borough of Barnet
Educational institutions established in 1855
Jewish seminaries
Jewish universities and colleges
Judaic studies
 
Orthodox Jewish educational institutions
1855 establishments in England